This article lists the largest power stations in the world, the ten overall and the five of each type, in terms of current installed electrical capacity. Non-renewable power stations are those that run on coal, fuel oils, nuclear fuel, natural gas, oil shale and peat, while renewable power stations run on fuel sources such as biomass, geothermal heat, hydro, solar energy, solar heat, tides and the wind. Only the most significant fuel source is listed for power stations that run on multiple sources.

As of 2021, the largest power generating facility ever built is the Three Gorges Dam in China. As of 2019, no power station comparable to Three Gorges is under construction, as the largest under construction power station is hydroelectric Baihetan Dam.

Proposed 20,000 MW Australia's Darwin Solar Park, for the Australia-Asia Power Link, would be slightly below the capacity of the Three Gorges Dam. Proposed Grand Inga Dam in the Congo would surpass all existing power stations, including the Three Gorges Dam, if construction commences as planned. The design targets to top  in installed capacity, nearly twice that of the Three Gorges.

Top 20 largest power producing facilities

Timeline of the largest power plants in the world 

At any point in time since the early 20th century, the largest power station in the world has been a hydroelectric power plant.

Non-renewable power stations

Coal

Fuel oil

Natural gas

Nuclear

Oil shale

Peat

Renewable power stations

Biomass

Geothermal

Hydroelectric

Conventional

Run-of-the-river

Tide

Solar power

Photovoltaic

Concentrated solar thermal

Wind

Onshore

Offshore

Storage power stations

Pumped-storage

Battery storage

Molten-salt

List of largest power station and unit within each country 

The following table lists the largest operating power station, and the largest single generating unit within each country.

See also 

 Power station
 List of power stations

References

External links 
 World's 39 largest electric power plants
 The Top 100: The World's Largest Power Plants
 The world's 25 biggest power plants

Lists of power stations
Economy-related lists of superlatives
Power stations
Power stations
Lists related to renewable energy